Jonathan Wren may refer to:
 Jonathan Wren (biologist)
 Jonathan Wren (rugby union)